Tishman is a surname. Notable people with the surname include:

Alan V. Tishman (1917–2004), American real estate developer
John L. Tishman (1926–2016), American real estate developer
Nimrod Tishman (born 1991), Israeli basketball player
Paul Tishman (1900–1996), American real estate developer
Robert Tishman (1916-2010), American real estate developer

See also
Tishman Realty & Construction
Tishman Speyer Properties